The Miller Red Bare-Un was a single seat lightweight sporting monoplane built by Merle Miller in Georgia, USA.

Design and development
Construction began in June 1970 and was completed in May 1971, with the first flight in June of that year. The wings (of 75 sq. ft.) were constructed of Polyethylene terephthalate (dacron)-covered wood ribs and spars, with full span ailerons. The fuselage was of open (uncovered) 4130 steel tube construction. It had tricycle gear with the main gear steel leaf sprung. The engine was a  Volkswagen air-cooled engine with a wooden tractor propeller mounted in line with the wing and above the pilot, similar to a Santos-Dumont Demoiselle.

The total construction cost was $600. The wing and tail surfaces were shaped in German World War I style, as was the paint scheme.

The single prototype was the only example produced. Plans are not available for sale.

Specifications

References

1970s United States sport aircraft
Aircraft first flown in 1971
Single-engined tractor aircraft
High-wing aircraft